Karsten Vogel  (born 11 January 1943) is a Danish composer. He is also a conductor, a saxophonist and a music teacher.

Vogel was born in Copenhagen and was awarded his MA in Danish language and literature in 1968 from University of Copenhagen. He has received several prizes for his works, e.g. a three-year scholarship from Statens Kunstfond.

He has composed for Radiojazzgruppen, the Danish National Chamber Orchestra and written a film score for the movie Er I bange, Er du grønlænder.

Collaborators
He has performed together with several individuals and groups:
Brødrene Vogels Kvartet (1967–1969)
Cadentia Nova Danica (1967–1972)
Burnin Red Ivanhoe
Secret Oyster (1972–1978)
Birds of Beauty (1977–1979)
Kenneth Knudsen (from 1975)
Frits Helmuth (who was reading H.C. Andersen and Oehlenschläger out loud)

See also
List of Danish composers

References
This article was initially translated from the Danish Wikipedia.

External links
Official website

Danish composers
Male composers
1943 births
Living people